Shigemitsu (written: 茂光 or 重光) is a masculine Japanese given name. Notable people with the name include:

 (1913–2012), Japanese judge and academic
 (born 1966), Japanese footballer
 (born 1956), Japanese footballer

Shigemitsu (written: 重光) is also a Japanese surname. Notable people with the surname include:

 (born 1955), Japanese-South Korean businessman
Junko Shigemitsu (born 1949), Japanese-American physicist
 (1887–1957), Japanese diplomat and politician
 (born 1983), Japanese footballer

Japanese-language surnames
Japanese masculine given names